Derek Ringer (born 11 October 1956) is a Scottish rally co-driver. He is most closely associated with Colin McRae, with whom he won the 1995 World Rally Championship.

Although their partnership extended back to the 1980s when McRae was a teenager, the two split at the end of 1996 when they failed to defend their title, several mid-season crashes being blamed on Ringer. After a year's absence, Ringer returned to partner Martin Rowe in the British Rally Championship, the pair winning the 1998 title in a Renault Mégane Maxi and competing together in the World Rally Championship in 1999.

Ringer then moved on to Mitsubishi for two years, before McRae's split with replacement co-driver Nicky Grist in 2002 reunited the two Scots for 2003. However, the partnership did not yield fresh success and both men lost their seats at Citroën. McRae competed in only three more world rallies, partnered by Nicky Grist on each occasion.

In February 2008, Ringer served as Travis Pastrana's interim co-driver beginning with the second-round, 100 Acre Wood event on 22 February.  Pastrana's former co-driver, Christian Edstrom announced his retirement from rallying after one race in January.

References 

1956 births
Scottish rally drivers
British rally co-drivers
World Rally Championship co-drivers
Living people